KFXX-FM (99.5 FM) is a commercial radio station licensed to Klamath Falls, Oregon, United States. The station is currently owned by Basin Mediactive, LLC.

History
The station was assigned the call letters KAGM on October 15, 1973. On May 16, 1980, the station changed its call sign to KAGO-FM. On May 8, 2017, the station changed its callsign to the current KFXX-FM.

On May 10, 2017, the station moved its mainstream rock format (and the KAGO-FM calls) to new sign-on 94.9 FM Altamont, Oregon, while 99.5 FM began stunting with a loop of Ylivs' "What Does the Fox Say", in preparation of a new format to launch on Friday, May 12, 2017 at 8 am. On May 12, 2017 at 8 am, KFXX-FM launched a classic hits format, branded as "99.5 The Fox".

References

External links

FXX-FM
Klamath Falls, Oregon
1973 establishments in Oregon
Classic hits radio stations in the United States
Radio stations established in 1973